Santiago Briñone (born 28 December 1996) is an Argentine professional footballer who plays as an attacking midfielder for Sportivo Estudiantes.

Career
Briñone began in the ranks of local team Santa Rosa, prior to subsequently having spells with Talleres and Patronato. He was promoted into Patronato's first-team by caretaker manager Martín de León, who selected Briñone to start in an Argentine Primera División match with San Lorenzo on 21 September 2018; with the forward featuring for sixty-seven minutes of a 3–2 defeat.

After spending the 2021 season at Sportivo Las Parejas, Briñone moved to Sportivo Estudiantes in January 2022.

Career statistics
.

References

External links

1996 births
Living people
Sportspeople from Córdoba Province, Argentina
Argentine footballers
Association football midfielders
Club Atlético Patronato footballers
Sportivo Las Parejas footballers
Club Sportivo Estudiantes players
Argentine Primera División players
Torneo Argentino A players